Pepsi One, corporately styled PEPSI ONE (so named because it contains one calorie per eight-fluid ounce [230 ml] serving), was a sugar-free cola, marketed by PepsiCo in the United States as an alternative to regular Pepsi and Diet Pepsi.

History
On June 30, 1998, the artificial sweetener acesulfame potassium (Ace-K) was approved for use by the Food and Drug Administration. PepsiCo responded within one hour, announcing the introduction of Pepsi One (which reached store shelves the following October). The original formulation was sweetened with aspartame and acesulfame potassium. This new variety was based upon an earlier product (sold in other countries) called Pepsi Max, but it featured a formula and flavor profile developed specifically for the U.S. market.

The launch of Pepsi One included an advertising campaign featuring the slogan "just one calorie."  Subsequently, comedian Tom Green appeared as the spokesperson in a series of television advertisements that began airing in April 1999.

Before 2012, Pepsi One was the last Pepsi variant to include the old logo used from 2003 to 2008, while all the other Pepsi variants had been using the current logo used since late 2008; the only other Pepsi product not using the current logo was Pepsi Throwback, which intentionally used retro packaging. However, Pepsi One's logo was later modernized with the current logo to be in line with the other flavors.

On March 21, 2005, Pepsi-Cola North America announced that it would begin adding sucralose to a newly reformulated Pepsi ONE in order to create a full-flavor cola taste.

In January 2014, Consumer Reports magazine tested levels of the chemical 4-methylimidazole (4-MeI)a potential carcinogenin various beverages in the United States and found that Pepsi ONE was one of two drinks that contained the chemical in excess of 29 micrograms per can or bottle, with that being California Proposition 65's daily allowed amount for foods without a warning label.

In mid-2015, after its sister product Diet Pepsi had changed to using sucralose and Ace-K as sweeteners instead of aspartame, Pepsi One was discontinued. PepsiCo wrote on its website that "Pepsi ONE has been discontinued. We regularly evaluate our product portfolio to find efficiencies, and we have decided to remove Pepsi ONE from the marketplace. Pepsi ONE has very limited distribution and will be out of the marketplace by start of the year 2015, and in some markets product inventory has already been exhausted."

The caffeine content was 57.1 mg per  serving.

Similarities
From its introduction in 1964 and until 1991, Diet Pepsi was also marketed as having one calorie per serving.

Racing

On April 7, 2010, it was announced that Pepsi One would be the title sponsor of Toyota Speedway at Irwindale's Super Late Models, the track's top division. The series was called the NASCAR Pepsi One Super Late Models.

See also
List of Pepsi variations

References

External links
PepsiCo

PepsiCo cola brands
Products introduced in 1998
Diet drinks
Discontinued soft drinks